Attercliffe is an industrial suburb of northeast Sheffield, England on the south bank of the River Don. The suburb falls in the Darnall ward of Sheffield City Council.

History

The name Attercliffe can be traced back as far as an entry in the Domesday Book -Ateclive- meaning at the cliffe, a small escarpment that lay alongside the River Don. This cliff can be seen in images from the 19th century, but is no longer visible.

Westforth or Washford Bridge, at the Sheffield end of the village, was first recorded in a will of 1535. It was rebuilt in wood in 1608 and 1647, then in stone in 1672, 1789 and 1794.

Historically a part of the parish of Sheffield, Attercliffe Chapel was built in 1629 as the first place of worship in the settlement. The Town School was built in 1779, and Christ Church was built in 1826 but destroyed during the Second World War.

In 1686, Richard Frankland set up a dissenting academy at Attercliffe Hall. Three years later, it was taken over by the nonconformist minister Timothy Jollie, who educated students including John Bowes, Nicholas Saunderson and Thomas Secker. Secker, later Archbishop of Canterbury, was frustrated by Jollie's poor teaching, famously remarking that he lost his knowledge of languages and that 'only the old Philosophy of the Schools was taught there: and that neither ably nor diligently. The morals also of many of the young Men were bad. I spent my time there idly & ill'.

In the early 19th century, Attercliffe remained a rural community known for its orchards, windmill, and large houses including the Old Hall, New Hall and Carlton House. New Hall was later converted into pleasure gardens, with a cricket ground, racecourse, bowling green, maze, lake and depictions of famous cities. It was known for its concerts and firework displays.

Small-scale manufacture of pen knife and pocket knife developed in the early 19th century, The suburb became more accessible with the construction of first a turnpike road from Sheffield to the terminus of the River Don Navigation at Tinsley, then the opening of the Sheffield Canal, running to the south of the village. In the late 19th and early 20th centuries, there was a frequent proposal to widen this to form a Sheffield Ship Canal, to terminate in a basin at Attercliffe.

Attercliffe railway station opened in August 1871 and closed on 26 September 1927.

Attercliffe has long been an industrial area, but by the early 20th century, there was also a large residential population and high class shops, John Banner's department store (Banner's) in particular. The area declined after the Second World War as Victorian housing was cleared which was not replaced, causing schools to close, followed by most of Attercliffe's shops, while some of the local industries closed or moved to larger sites further out of Sheffield.

Adelphi Cinema 

The Adelphi was a cinema on Vicarage Road, built in 1920 by architect William C. Fenton. The cinema closed in 1967, and the building was then used as a bingo hall under the name "Adelphi Bingo Club" and a nightclub. It is currently disused.

Attractions

Its location on the Sheffield Supertram route, the completion of the Five Weirs Walk and construction of the Don Valley Stadium and Sheffield Arena in the 1990s brought some life back to the area. As part of the area's regeneration, new house building started in 2002. Don Valley Stadium was demolished in 2013, but other entertainment venues bring visitors to the area, including Hollywood Bowl & Cineworld. This has changed Attercliffe from its previous seedy element to an area for outer city entertainment with the introduction of Valley Centertainment.

It is home to one of the highest concentrations of sporting facilities in the UK with the Olympic Legacy Park, incorporating iceSheffield and the English Institute of Sport.

Politics
Attercliffe falls within the Darnall Ward. Sheffield Attercliffe was the name of one of Sheffield's parliamentary constituencies from 1885 to 2010, when it was renamed Sheffield South East.

References

External links
 
 Pictures of the Adelphi Cinema
 Sources for the History of Attercliffe Produced by Sheffield City Council's Libraries and Archives

 
Suburbs of Sheffield